Brazil competed at the 2018 Winter Olympics in Pyeongchang, South Korea, from 9 to 25 February 2018, with 9 competitors in 5 sports.

Competitors
The following is the list of number of competitors participating in the Brazilian delegation per sport.

Alpine skiing

Brazil qualified one male athlete. Michel Macedo competed in both slalom and giant slalom competitions. He failed to complete the course in men's slalom and giant slalom and subsequent chose not to start in super-G competition.

Bobsleigh 

Based on their rankings in the 2017–18 Bobsleigh World Cup, Brazil qualified two sleds. Due to Brazil's tropical climate, the bobsleigh team partnered with Team USA and trained at Lake Placid. All of the Brazilian team members have part-time jobs as personal trainers or coaches.

* – Denotes the driver of each sled

Cross-country skiing 

Brazil qualified 1 male and 1 female skier.
Distance

Figure skating 

Isadora Williams earned Brazil a berth in the Olympics with her performance in the 2017 CS Nebelhorn Trophy

Snowboarding 

Brazil qualified 1 female snowboarder.

Snowboard cross

 She suffered an accident and was injured in a training session on February 15.

See also
Brazil at the 2018 Winter Paralympics
Brazil at the 2018 South American Games
Brazil at the 2018 Summer Youth Olympics

References

Nations at the 2018 Winter Olympics
2018 Winter Olympics
Olympics